The 2007 AFL Grand Final was an Australian rules football game contested between the Geelong Football Club and the Port Adelaide Football Club, held at the Melbourne Cricket Ground in Melbourne on 29 September 2007. It was the 111th annual Grand Final of the Australian Football League (formerly the Victorian Football League), staged to determine the premiers for the 2007 AFL season. The match, attended by 97,302 spectators, was won by Geelong by a margin of 119 points, the greatest winning margin in VFL/AFL grand final history. The victory marked Geelong's seventh premiership win, and ended its 44-year premiership drought.

Background

 

Geelong entered the season after finishing 10th in 2006. Geelong was the best performing side of the home and away season, finishing 12 points clear of second-placed Port Adelaide, with an 18–4 record and a percentage of 152.76, winning the McClelland Trophy. After opening the season with a 2–3 record, Geelong had lost only one game of its last 19 games: by five points against Port Adelaide at Skilled Stadium in Round 21 when Domenic Cassisi goaled with three seconds remaining. The grand final was Geelong's first appearance in a premiership decider since 1995 AFL Grand Final, where they lost to Carlton. Geelong defeated the Kangaroos in their qualifying final at the Melbourne Cricket Ground by 106 points, earning them a second week bye, before they met Collingwood in a preliminary final showdown at the MCG. Geelong won a tight contest with the Magpies by 5 points in front of a crowd of 98,002.

Port Adelaide had finished 12th the previous season, but rose 10 places to finish second on the ladder in 2007, with a 15–7 record and a percentage of 113.54. Port Adelaide had hosted reigning premiers West Coast Eagles at AAMI Stadium in their qualifying final, winning by three points after trailing all night. Having also earned a second week bye, they proceeded to the third week and hosted the Kangaroos in a preliminary final at AAMI Stadium, winning by 87 points. The 2007 AFL Grand Final was Port Adelaide's first since winning the 2004 Grand Final.

It was the first grand final fought between two teams that missed the finals the previous year since 1997.

Match summary 

The grand final was a one-sided affair from start to finish.  outscored  5.7 (37) to 2.2 (14) in the opening quarter, with only inaccurate goalkicking preventing a greater advantage. They then kicked five goals in the first 12 minutes of the second quarter to extend the margin to 52 points, all but ending any chances Port Adelaide had. Seven goals to one in the third quarter extended the lead to 90 points, and another seven goals to one in the final quarter saw the lead balloon to a game-high 128 points, before eventually finishing at 119 points.

Geelong excelled in its defence—which had been the best in the competition all season—keeping the Power to their lowest score of the year. The backlines, led by Matthew Scarlett at full-back, repeatedly turned defence into attack, rushing the ball forward to support the forward line, as evidenced by Scarlett's tally of 29 disposals (tied with Corey Enright for Geelong's most disposals), rare for a team, especially a team who had won by a 100-point-plus margin. Half-forwards Paul Chapman and Steve Johnson kicked four goals each and set up numerous others. Johnson was awarded the Norm Smith Medal for his best-on-ground performance in the grand final after the Cats’ triumph. Chapman's day included a high mark over Port Adelaide captain Warren Tredrea during the third quarter. Key forwards Cameron Mooney (five goals) and Nathan Ablett (three) also performed strongly. Power player Domenic Cassisi performed reasonably well against Geelong star Gary Ablett, Jr.; however, Geelong were still able to dominate the midfield, with Joel Corey, James Kelly, and Cameron Ling all making solid contributions, while Brad Ottens and Steven King both performing strongly in the ruck.

The match ended with Geelong winning by the score of 24.19 (163) to 6.8 (44), recording the greatest winning margin in AFL grand final history, 119 points. This broke the previous record of 96 points set by Hawthorn against Melbourne in the 1988 VFL Grand Final; it was also, at the time, Port Adelaide's heaviest defeat in an AFL match (this record was surpassed twice in two consecutive weeks in 2011, culminating in a 165-point loss to Hawthorn). Geelong's 417 disposals was a new grand final record, while Port Adelaide became the only finals side in history to have more handballs than kicks.

Aftermath 
The Cats’ win ended a 44-year premiership drought for the club. Their last flag had come in 1963, and since then the club had lost five grand finals. It was the first premiership won by a team from Victoria since Essendon’s 2000 victory. It was the start of a period of sustained dominance by Geelong, which saw it win three premierships from four grand finals over a five-year period from 2007–2011.

, this remains the last grand final appearance for Port Adelaide. The success of the 2007 season proved an aberration, as the club's rise from 12th to 2nd on the ladder in 2007 was followed by a drop to 13th in 2008.

Because the 44-year drought had been broken, celebrations in the homes, pubs, nightclubs, and streets of Geelong continued throughout the night and into the next day. The day after the grand final, around 30,000 fans turned out to welcome the team back to their home ground at Kardinia Park.

Norm Smith Medal 

Steve Johnson was awarded the Norm Smith Medal for being voted as the best-performing player of the match. He recorded 23 disposals, 9 marks, and 4 goals. Also polling were Paul Chapman (21 disposals, 7 marks, and 4 goals), and Matthew Scarlett (29 disposals and 8 marks).

The voters and their choices were as follows:

Scorecard

Teams

See also 
2007 AFL season
2007 AFL Finals Series

References 

Match stats at AFL Tables
AFL Website

VFL/AFL Grand Finals
AFL Grand Final
Grand Final
Geelong Football Club
Port Adelaide Football Club